Lenape is an unincorporated community in Pocopson Township in Chester County, Pennsylvania, United States. Lenape is centered on the intersection of Pennsylvania Route 52 and Pocopson Road west of the Brandywine Creek.

History
A post office called Lenape was established in 1870, and remained in operation until it was discontinued in 1923. The community was named after the Lenape Indians.

References

Unincorporated communities in Chester County, Pennsylvania
Unincorporated communities in Pennsylvania